The OmniCube is a product offering from Hewlett Packard Enterprise (HPE). It was developed by SimpliVity, a technology company headquartered in Westborough, Massachusetts acquired by HPE in 2017.

HPE SimpliVity OmniCube hyper-convergence technology provides a single software stack that combines the jobs of multiple IT infrastructure products into one shared x86 resource pool. OmniCube collapses legacy stacks and functionality into hyper-converged x86 building blocks. OmniCube consists of one or more 2U building blocks based on commodity x86 systems, pre-configured with SSD, flash, HDD storage, and connected in an efficient scale-out manner. The system easily scales by adding additional 2U OmniCubes to create very large-scale environments in small increments.

OmniCube features high availability and no single point of failure, and systems can be deployed across multiple locations, such as remote or branch offices. In addition to integrating server compute, storage and network switching features, HPE SimpliVity extends capabilities with centralized management of geographically distributed systems; built-in VM data protection and off-site backup. OmniCube’s Data Virtualization Platform deduplicates, compresses, and optimizes data when it is first created—with no impact on performance. It encompasses all VMs running on OmniCube’s globally federated hyper-converged infrastructure.

Sources:

References

Data centers